The 1971 Nippon Professional Baseball season was the 22nd season of operation of Nippon Professional Baseball (NPB).

Regular season

Standings

League leaders

Central League

Pacific League

Awards
Most Valuable Player
Shigeo Nagashima, Yomiuri Giants (CL)
Tokuji Nagaike, Hankyu Braves (PL)
Rookie of the Year
Shitoshi Sekimoto, Yomiuri Giants (CL)
Yasuo Minagawa, Toei Flyers (PL)
Eiji Sawamura Award
 Not awarded

References